The 2005–06 season was Swindon Town's sixth season in the League One since their relegation from the second tier of English football in 2000. Alongside the league campaign, Swindon Town will also competed in the FA Cup, League Cup and the Football League Trophy.

League One

Results and matchday squads

League One line-ups 

1 1st Substitution, 2 2nd Substitution, 3 3rd Substitution.

FA Cup line-ups 

1 1st Substitution, 2 2nd Substitution, 3 3rd Substitution.

League Cup line-ups 

1 1st Substitution, 2 2nd Substitution, 3 3rd Substitution.

Football League Trophy line-ups 

1 1st Substitution, 2 2nd Substitution, 3 3rd Substitution.

References 

Swindon Town F.C. seasons
Swindon Town F.C.